Marco Fiorani (born 21 March 2002) is an Italian professional footballer who plays as a midfielder for  club Messina on loan from Ascoli.

Career
Born in Faenza, Fiorani started his career in Cesena and Ravenna youth sector. He was promoted to Ravenna first team for the 2019–20 season. He made his professional debut in Serie C on 3 November 2019 against Carpi. On 15 September 2020, he extended his contract with the club.

On 8 August 2021, he signed with Serie B club Ascoli.

On 7 August 2021, he was loaned to Serie C club Teramo.

On 7 August 2022, Fiorani moved on loan to Messina.

References

External links
 
 

2002 births
Living people
People from Faenza
Footballers from Emilia-Romagna
Italian footballers
Association football midfielders
Serie C players
A.C. Cesena players
Ravenna F.C. players
Ascoli Calcio 1898 F.C. players
S.S. Teramo Calcio players
A.C.R. Messina players
Sportspeople from the Province of Ravenna